An elephant gun is a large caliber gun, rifled or smoothbore, originally developed for use by big-game hunters for elephant and other large game. Elephant guns were black powder muzzle-loaders at first, then black powder express rifles, then later used smokeless powder cartridges.

Early use
As Europeans made inroads into Africa in the early 19th century, guns were developed to handle the very large game encountered. This was for self-protection, food gathering, and sport. The first guns were the simple muzzle-loading shotgun designs already used for birds and loaded with solid balls of lead for use on large game. Due to their ineffectiveness on the largest game (up to 35 shots being recorded by some writers for a single elephant), they soon developed into larger caliber black powder smoothbores. The caliber was still measured in bore or gauge—10, 8, 6, 4 bore, and 2 bore—or the guns were named by number of projectiles per pound. The projectiles were lead round balls or short conical slugs, sometimes hardened with antimony.

These very large and very heavy firearms were the first to be known as the elephant guns of the black powder era (1850–1900), though their use also included all thick-skinned dangerous game such as rhinoceros, hippopotamus and cape buffalo. Due to the velocity limitations of black powder and lead—usually around —the only way to increase penetration was to make a larger gun. Despite their enormous power, the short low-velocity slugs still suffered the penetration issues which plagued guns of this era, particularly for the toughest shot of all: defeating the bone mass for a frontal brain shot on an elephant. Thus, dangerous game hunting in the 19th century was as much a test of the gun-bearer's ability to relay guns to the hunter, and of horsemanship to evade charges long enough to reload.

Following the bore guns were the brass case "express" rounds, which incorporated black powder with modern ballistics by making relatively smaller projectiles go faster. The dangerous game projectiles were often hardened lead alloy. The .577 Black Powder Express was the go-to dangerous game caliber from the 1870s through 1900. It spawned the .577 Express around 1890, which used smokeless cordite instead of black powder, and then the .577 Nitro Express in 1900, which used modern metal jacketed and solid bullets pushed by more modern smokeless powders. 

It was not until the parallel developments of jacketed projectiles, closely followed by smokeless powders in the late 19th century, that dangerous game could be taken with near 100% certainty.

Nitro Express rifles 

The Nitro Express line (c.1895), so named because the composition of the early smokeless powders such as Poudre B, ballistite and cordite, were the first of the new order of elephant guns. With smaller metal-jacketed projectiles ranging from .400 to .620 inch caliber and velocities around  they possessed vastly improved trajectory and penetration over their black powder forebears. Within a few years the mighty bore guns of the previous era largely disappeared from the gamefields. The safari heyday of the early 20th century "nitro era" records much literature on such calibers as the .577 Nitro Express, .375 H&H Magnum, .416 Rigby, .404 Jeffery, .505 Gibbs, .450 Nitro Express, and .470 Nitro Express. These rifles came out in single shot, bolt action, and double rifle configurations and continued to be used until ivory hunting died off in the mid-20th century. Thereafter, they largely switched roles to tools for game wardens and as back-up firearms for professional hunters guiding international hunters.

The American gun market produced several famous dangerous game cartridges around this time, such as the .458 Winchester Magnum, .378 Weatherby Magnum and .460 Weatherby Magnum and many of these were "wildcatted" (to modify an existing case and rifle to fire a different caliber bullet). The rest of the old Nitro express calibers had faded into obscurity until a resurgence in safari hunting came about in the 1970s and 1980s. This prompted a new boom in elephant gun development and calibers such as the .416 Weatherby Magnum and .416 Remington Magnum arrived in factory offerings. The late 1980s and 1990s produced the .700 Nitro Express and the new brass manufacturers allowed even more powerful elephant guns such as the .585 Nyati by Ross Seyfried, .577 Tyrannosaur by Colonel Art Alphin and .585 Gehringer by Karl Gehringer to be made by wildcatters. The .600 Overkill made by Rob Garnick represents the greatest power available from a standard hunting action. Other wildcats based on the heavy machine gun .50 BMG and similar anti-materiel rounds have been devised which are much more powerful, though they are not generally considered useful hunting arms as their weight usually exceeds .

Use in war
During World War I, both the British and Germans deployed elephant guns obtained from their African colonies in an attempt to break the stalemate in the trenches. The British used elephant guns as a means of countering the German tactic of having their snipers advance towards Allied lines under the cover of a large, 6–10 millimeter (0.24–0.4 inch) thick steel plate.  Though normal small arms were ineffective against the plate, the elephant guns of the era had enough force to punch through it. In addition, to penetrate steel plate loopholes, large caliber firearms, such as elephant guns, were deployed to eliminate snipers.

During the African campaigns of World War II in 1941, the commander of the Italian forces, the Duke of Aosta, gave his personal collection of elephant guns to his soldiers to aid in armor penetration of British armored cars, as Italian AT guns were in short supply. 

The Finnish 20 mm anti-tank gun Lahti L-39 gained the nickname  meaning "Elephant Gun" during the Continuation War because of its stopping power, as did the British Boys anti-tank rifle of World War II. These are not elephant guns, however, since they were designed as purely military weapons.

See also
Express rifle
Java arquebus
Jiaozhi arquebus
Wall gun

References

Further reading
* Boddington, Craig (1990), Safari Rifles, Long Beach, California:  Safari Press. ISBN 0-940143-49-6 

Elephants
Hunting equipment
Rifles
Hunting rifles
Elephant hunting
Livestock